The 1990 NCAA Division I women's volleyball tournament began with 32 teams and ended on December 15, 1990, when UCLA defeated Pacific 3 games to 0 in the NCAA championship match.

UCLA won the program's second NCAA title in women's volleyball by defeating Pacific 15-9, 15-12, 15-7. UCLA was led by Natalie Williams and Marissa Hatchett who had 12 kills a piece. The Bruins finished the 1990 season 36-1.

The 1990 Final Four was held at the Cole Field House in College Park, Maryland.

Records
{|
| valign=top |

Brackets

West regional

South regional

Mideast regional

Northwest regional

Final Four - Cole Field House, College Park, Maryland

NCAA tournament records

There is one NCAA tournament record that was set in the 1990 NCAA tournament.

Kills, match (team record) - 112 - Texas vs. LSU

See also
NCAA Women's Volleyball Championship

References

NCAA Women's Volleyball Championship
NCAA
Volleyball in Maryland
1990 in sports in Maryland
December 1990 sports events in the United States
Sports competitions in Maryland